, known by her stage name  is a Japanese actress from Ishinomaki. Suzukaze has also done some voice work as a voice actress, namely as the voice of Himura Kenshin in Rurouni Kenshin. She was previously a Takarazuka Revue stage actress and the Top Star of Moon Troupe. Her best-known Takarazuka role was that of Oscar François de Jarjayes in the 1991 Moon Troupe production of The Rose of Versailles.

Filmography

Television

Television animation
Jungle Taitei Susume Leo as Guest
Le Chevalier D'Eon as Mary Shalott
Rurouni Kenshin as Himura Kenshin
The Snow Queen as Snow Queen

Theatre

Dubbing
The Replacement Killers, Meg Coburn (Mira Sorvino)

References

External links
 Official blog 
 Mayo Suzukaze at GamePlaza-Haruka Voice Acting Database 
 Mayo Suzukaze at Hitoshi Doi's Seiyuu Database 

1960 births
Living people
Actors from Miyagi Prefecture
Japanese stage actresses
Japanese television actresses
Japanese voice actresses
People from Ishinomaki
Takarazuka Revue
Voice actresses from Miyagi Prefecture